Debanandapur is a village beside Saraswati Rver and a gram panchayat in the Chinsurah Mogra CD block in the Chinsurah subdivision of the Hooghly district in the state of West Bengal, India.

The village  has ancient temples like Radha Krishna Temple beside Saraswati River. The said temple is in dilapidated condition.

Geography

Location

Sarat Chandra Chatterjee’s birth place
Debanandapur is the birth place of the novelist Sarat Chandra Chattopadhyay. His dwelling house is now a library named Sarat Smriti Pathagar and a museum housing his belongings. It is 2 km from Bandel Junction railway station.

Demographics
According to the 2011 Census of India, Debanandapur had a total population of 3,449 of which 1,789 (52%) were males and 1,660 (48%) were females. Population in the age range 0-6 years was 315. The total number of literate persons in Debanandapur was 2,481 (79.16% of the population over 6 years).

References

Villages in Hooghly district
Neighbourhoods in Kolkata
Kolkata Metropolitan Area